
Gmina Olszewo-Borki is a rural gmina (administrative district) in Ostrołęka County, Masovian Voivodeship, in east-central Poland. Its seat is the village of Olszewo-Borki, which lies approximately 3 kilometres (2 mi) south-west of Ostrołęka and 99 km (61 mi) north-east of Warsaw.

Villages
Gmina Olszewo-Borki contains the villages and settlements of Antonie, Białobrzeg Bliższy, Białobrzeg Dalszy, Chojniki, Dobrołęka, Drężewo, Działyń, Grabnik, Grabówek, Grabowo, Kordowo, Kruki, Łazy, Mostówek, Mostowo, Nakły, Nowa Wieś, Nożewo, Olszewo-Borki, Przystań, Rataje, Rżaniec, Stepna Stara, Stepna-Michałki, Wyszel, Zabiele Wielkie, Zabiele-Piliki, Zabrodzie, Żebry-Chudek, Żebry-Ostrowy, Żebry-Perosy, Żebry-Sławki, Żebry-Stara Wieś, Żebry-Wierzchlas, Żebry-Żabin, Żerań Duży and Żerań Mały.

Neighbouring gminas
Gmina Olszewo-Borki is bordered by the city of Ostrołęka and by the gminas of Baranowo, Krasnosielc, Lelis, Młynarze, Rzekuń and Sypniewo.

References

Polish official population figures 2006

Olszewo-Borki
Gmina Olszewo Borki